Rhodactina himalayensis is a species of secotioid fungus in the family Boletaceae, and the type species of genus Rhodactina. Originally described from Uttar Pradesh in 1989, it is also found in Dipterocarpaceae-dominated forests in Chang Mai, northern Thailand. It grows in association with roots of Shorea robusta.

References

External links

Boletaceae
Fungi described in 1989
Fungi of Asia
Secotioid fungi